Mel Grant Counts (born October 16, 1941) is an American retired basketball player who played in the National Basketball Association (NBA) from 1964 to 1976.  An excellent outside shooter for a 7 footer, he was on the United States Olympic basketball team that won the gold at the 1964 Summer Olympics.  He played in college for Oregon State University and was selected by the Boston Celtics in the 1964 NBA draft. The Celtics won the NBA Championship in 1965 and 1966 with Counts on the team as Bill Russell's backup, but he was traded for the 1967 season to the Baltimore Bullets. Halfway through that season he was traded to the Los Angeles Lakers, who made it to the playoffs that year.

The next three seasons Counts' Lakers made it to the NBA Finals, where they would play in and ultimately lose three years in a row.  In the 1969 NBA Finals, Counts indirectly played a role in one of the most controversial coaching decisions in NBA history. In game 7, starting Laker center Wilt Chamberlain, who had never fouled out of a game, picked up his 5th foul with 6 minutes to play. A minute later, Wilt came off the floor limping and was replaced by Counts with the Lakers trailing the Celtics by nine points.  The Lakers cut the deficit to one point on a shot by Counts, with coach Butch van Breda Kolff refusing to reinsert Chamberlain into the game in the final minutes even though Wilt said his knee felt good enough to play.  The Lakers lost the game, 108–106, and the series, 4–3. 

Counts played one more season with the Lakers before being traded to the Phoenix Suns with the Lakers gaining the return of hall of famer Gail Goodrich (he started with the Lakers but went to Phoenix in the 1967 expansion draft).  After several more stops around the league, including a return to the Lakers in 1973, Counts ended his career with the New Orleans Jazz in 1976.

As of 2006, he was working as a real estate agent in Salem, Oregon.   His son Brent played college basketball at the University of the Pacific, his son Brian played at Western Oregon University and his son Chris played at Sheridan Junior College and South Dakota State.  His grandsons Brent Jr. played at St. Martin's University and Patrick at Chemeketa Community College and California Maritime Academy.  Mixed martial artist Chael Sonnen is his nephew.

References

1941 births
Living people
All-American college men's basketball players
American men's basketball players
Baltimore Bullets (1963–1973) players
Basketball players at the 1964 Summer Olympics
Basketball players from Oregon
Boston Celtics draft picks
Boston Celtics players
Centers (basketball)
Los Angeles Lakers players
Medalists at the 1964 Summer Olympics
New Orleans Jazz players
Olympic gold medalists for the United States in basketball
Oregon State Beavers men's basketball players
People from Coos Bay, Oregon
Philadelphia 76ers players
Phoenix Suns players
Power forwards (basketball)
United States men's national basketball team players